The 2012 Night of Champions was the sixth annual Night of Champions professional wrestling pay-per-view (PPV) event produced by WWE. It took place on September 16, 2012, at the TD Garden in Boston, Massachusetts. The theme of the event was that all sanctioned championships promoted on WWE's main roster at the time were defended on the card. The event managed to gain 189,000 buys, which was up from last year's event, which gained a 169,000 buy rate.

Production

Background
Night of Champions was an annual pay-per-view (PPV) event produced by WWE since 2007. The 2012 event was the sixth event in the Night of Champions chronology. It was held on September 16, 2012, at the TD Garden in Boston, Massachusetts. As per the theme of the event, every championship promoted on WWE's main roster at the time was defended—this specification of main roster championships came as a result of the establishment of WWE's developmental territory NXT earlier in the year, which had its own championship with two more introduced the following year. The main roster championships promoted by WWE in 2012 included the WWE Championship, the World Heavyweight Championship, the Intercontinental Championship, the United States Championship, the WWE Tag Team Championship, and the WWE Divas Championship.

Storylines
The professional wrestling matches at Night of Champions featured professional wrestlers performing as characters in scripted events pre-determined by the hosting promotion, WWE. Storylines between the characters played out on WWE's primary television programs, Raw and SmackDown.

One featured match involved champion Sheamus against Alberto Del Rio for the World Heavyweight Championship. Upon being defeated by Sheamus again at SummerSlam, Del Rio felt that because the referee did not see that his foot was on the bottom rope during the pin, he deserved another chance at the championship. Sheamus felt that Del Rio had enough chances to beat him and said that Randy Orton, who just returned from suspension, deserved a chance at the championship. Del Rio defeated Orton to earn a title match at the event.

Another highly promoted match was CM Punk defending the WWE Championship against John Cena. At Raw 1000 when Cena cashed in his Money in the Bank briefcase against Punk and failed to win the championship due to interference by Big Show that resulted in a disqualification. This led to a triple threat match at SummerSlam featuring Punk, Cena, and Show, which Punk won. The following night on Raw, Punk was granted the right to choose his challenger at Night of Champions. He announced that he would face John Cena on the condition that he would admit on live television that Punk was the "best in the world" but Cena refused. The following week on Raw, Raw General Manager AJ Lee announced that Punk would defend the title against Cena at the event.

Event

Pre-Show 
Prior to the start of the pay-per-view, a 16-man battle royal for a United States Championship match later in the event took place. Zack Ryder won the match by last eliminating Tensai.

Preliminary matches 
The event opened with The Miz defending the Intercontinental Championship against Rey Mysterio, Cody Rhodes and Sin Cara in a fatal four-way match. In the end, Sin Cara placed a mask on Miz's head. Rhodes performed the Cross Rhodes on Cara, but The Miz, despite being blinded by the mask, performed the Skull-Crushing Finale on Rhodes to retain the title.

Next, Kofi Kingston and R-Truth defended the Tag Team Championship against Daniel Bryan and Kane (later known as Team Hell No). The match ended when Bryan pushed Kane off the top rope, causing him to fall onto Kingston into a successful pinfall. In result, Bryan and Kane won the title.

After that, Antonio Cesaro defended the United States Championship against Zack Ryder. Cesaro executed a Neutralizer on Ryder to retain the title.

In the fourth match, Randy Orton wrestled Dolph Ziggler. Orton executed an elevated DDT off the barricade on Ziggler and attempted to pin Ziggler in the ring, but Ziggler placed his foot on the bottom rope, voiding the pinfall. In the end, Orton attempted an RKO, but Ziggler countered the move into a sleeper hold, which Orton escaped. Orton performed an RKO on a leaping Ziggler for the win.

Next, Layla defended the Divas Championship against Eve.  After Kaitlyn was attacked, SmackDown general manager Booker T scheduled Layla to defend against Eve. Eve executed the Heart Breaker on Layla to win the title for a record third time.

After that, Sheamus defended the World Heavyweight Championship against Alberto Del Rio. Before the match, Booker T relinquished his ban of the Brogue Kick. In the end, Del Rio missed a step-up enziguri on Sheamus, who was in the corner. Sheamus executed a Brogue Kick on Del Rio to retain the title.

Main event 
In the main event, CM Punk defended the WWE Championship against John Cena. Punk applied the Anaconda vise on Cena, but Cena countered into the STF, which Punk countered into a crossface, which Cena escaped. Punk executed the diving elbow drop for a near-fall. Punk went for a GTS, but Cena countered into the STF, with Punk reaching the ropes to break the hold. Punk executed a Go To Sleep on Cena for a near-fall. Cena executed an Attitude Adjustment for a near-fall. Punk performed a second Go to Sleep on Cena for a near-fall. Punk performed a Rock Bottom on Cena for a near-fall. Cena executed another Attitude Adjustment on Punk for a near-fall. Cena executed a bridging German superplex off the top rope on Punk to win the match. As Cena was celebrating, the referee declared a draw due to a double pin, thus Punk retaining the title. When Cena stopped celebrating, Punk hit Cena with the title belt as he stood tall in the middle of the ring and exited with manager Paul Heyman to close the show.

Results

References

External links
TD Garden official website
Night of Champions official website
Night of Champions event page

2012 in Boston
2012
Events in Boston
Entertainment events in Boston
Professional wrestling in Boston
2012 WWE pay-per-view events
September 2012 events in the United States

es:WWE Night of Champions#2012